St Stephen's Church, Little Ilford is the Roman Catholic parish church for Little Ilford and Manor Park, two areas in Newham, east London. It was first built in 1924 as a chapel to St Nicholas', Manor Park. St Stephen's was rebuilt in 1959 and became the parish church, with St Nicholas' as its chapel, the status both churches still hold today.

References

Stephen
Christian organizations established in 1924
Roman Catholic churches completed in 1959
Roman Catholic chapels in England